The Dacinae are a subfamily of the fruit fly family Tephritidae. Its 41 genera are distributed among three tribes:

 Tribe Ceratitidini:
 Capparimyia
 Carpophthoromyia
 Ceratitella
 Ceratitis
 Eumictoxenus
 Neoceratitis
 Nippia
 Paraceratitella
 Paratrirhithrum
 Perilampsis
 Trirhithrum
 Xanthorrachista
 Tribe Dacini:
 Bactrocera
 Dacus
 Monacrostichus
 Zeugodacus
 Tribe Gastrozonini:
 Acroceratitis
 Acrotaeniostola
 Anoplomus
 Bistrispinaria
 Carpophthorella
 Ceratitoides
 Chaetellipsis
 Chelyophora
 Clinotaenia
 Cyrtostola
 Dietheria
 Enicoptera
 Galbifascia
 Gastrozona
 Ichneumonopsis
 Leucotaeniella
 Paragastrozona
 Paraxarnuta
 Phaeospila
 Phaeospilodes
 Proanoplomus
 Rhaibophleps
 Sinanoplomus
 Spilocosmia
 Taeniostola

Other genera include:
Xanthorrachis

References

External links

 
Brachycera subfamilies